Cristian Petrescu (born March 31, 1971) is a Romanian politician, president of the Bucharest Branch of the People's Movement Party .

Born in Bucharest, he is a 2004 graduate of the Ecological University of Bucharest, where he earned a degree in physical education and sport. A member of the Democratic Liberal Party, he sat in a Bucharest seat in the Romanian Chamber of Deputies from 2008 to 2012. From February to April 2012, in the government of Mihai-Răzvan Ungureanu, he served as Minister of Regional Development and Tourism. He ran unsuccessfully for mayor of the Sector 3, Bucharest, during the 2016 local elections.

Notes

1971 births
Politicians from Bucharest
Democratic Liberal Party (Romania) politicians
Romanian Ministers of Regional Development
Members of the Chamber of Deputies (Romania)
Living people